Michael Schulz (born 3 September 1961) is a German former professional footballer who played as a central defender. He played 243 matches in the Bundesliga for Borussia Dortmund, Werder Bremen and 1. FC Kaiserslautern and scored eight goals.

Club career 
Schulz was born in Witten. He had the reputation of being one of the hardest defenders in the Bundesliga. He collected 48 yellow and 2 red cards. He was a favourite at Borussia Dortmund and Werder Bremen, his fans regularly chanting "Schuuuuuuuuuulz" whenever he had the ball. Fellow Bremen player Christian Schulz and fellow Dortmund player Nico Schulz, who bear no relationship to him, were regularly celebrated like this because of him. In Panini's World Championship collector's cards edition 1994 he is described as "an anchor as header, strong in duels, feared for his wide throw-ins. The Charles Bronson type of guy overdoes toughness." Michael Schulz made nearly 250 (West) German top-flight appearances.

International career 
He played seven times for the German national team from 1992 to 1993. He also competed for West Germany at the 1988 Summer Olympics.

Post-playing career 
Schulz works as a player agent at the Hamburg-based sport management agency Extratime. He's additionally in the field for several German TV channels and since August 2009 also as a field reporter for Deutsche Telekom's football channel Liga total.

"Curse" of Michael Schulz

Although Schulz was one of the best defenders of his generation, top titles eluded him. The special sting in his case was the fact that each team he played for was highly successful after he was transferred away, leading to speculation he was cursed.

1. FC Kaiserslautern (1987–1989): in this period, FCK was a scrub team which constantly flirted with relegation. After Schulz was shipped away, FCK won the German Cup in 1990 and the German Championship in 1991.
Borussia Dortmund (1989–1994): BVB was a midfield team when Schulz was there. But then, Schulz feuded with Matthias Sammer and was sent away, just before BVB won two German Championships in 1995 and 1996 and the UEFA Champions League in 1997.
Werder Bremen (1994–1997): Schulz joined Bremen just after Werder had won two German Championships and the German Cup. During his period, Werder suffered a drought and won nothing, apart from the 1994 DFB-Supercup. However, in 1999, Werder won the German Cup again after Schulz had left.

In a 1997 issue of the German football magazine kicker, published when Schulz announced his retirement, he was asked in the column Mal ehrlich (Now, seriously), whether Bremen, now that Schulz was stopping, would finally win something. He answered, "This is a sure-fire tip! I'd bet on it anytime", acknowledging the existence of his jinx.

Honours
Borussia Dortmund
 DFL-Supercup: 1989
 UEFA Cup finalist: 1992–93

Werder Bremen
 DFL-Supercup: 1994

West Germany Olympic
 Olympic bronze medal: 1988

Germany
 UEFA European Championship runner-up: 1992
 1993 U.S. Cup

References

External links
 
 
 

1961 births
Living people
People from Witten
Sportspeople from Arnsberg (region)
German footballers
Association football defenders
Germany international footballers
VfB Oldenburg players
1. FC Kaiserslautern players
Borussia Dortmund players
SV Werder Bremen players
Bundesliga players
Olympic footballers of West Germany
West German footballers
Footballers at the 1988 Summer Olympics
UEFA Euro 1992 players
Olympic bronze medalists for West Germany
Olympic medalists in football
Footballers from North Rhine-Westphalia
Medalists at the 1988 Summer Olympics